In combinatorial mathematics, the hook length formula is a formula for the number of standard Young tableaux whose shape is a given Young diagram.
It has applications in diverse areas such as representation theory, probability, and algorithm analysis; for example, the problem of longest increasing subsequences. A related formula gives the number of semi-standard Young tableaux, which is a specialization of a Schur polynomial.

Definitions and statement 

It is customary to interpret  graphically as a Young diagram, namely a left-justified array of square cells with  rows of lengths .
A (standard) Young tableau of shape  is a filling of the  cells of the Young diagram with all the integers , with no repetition, such that each row and each column form increasing sequences.

where the product is over all cells  of the Young diagram.

Examples 

The figure on the right shows hook lengths for the cells in the Young diagram , corresponding to the partition 9 = 4 + 3 + 1 + 1. The hook length formula gives the number of standard Young tableaux as:

A Catalan number counts Dyck paths with  steps going up (U) interspersed with  steps going down (D), such that at each step there are never more preceding D's than U's. These are in bijection with the Young tableaux of shape : a Dyck path corresponds to the tableau whose first row lists the positions of the U-steps, while the second row lists the positions of the D-steps. For example, UUDDUD correspond to the tableaux with rows 125 and 346.

This shows that , so the hook formula specializes to the well-known product formula

History 

A less convenient formula expressing  in terms of a determinant was deduced independently by Frobenius and Young in 1900 and 1902 respectively using algebraic methods.
MacMahon found an alternate proof for the Young–Frobenius formula in 1916 using difference methods.

The hook length formula itself was discovered in 1953 by Frame, Robinson, and Thrall as an improvement to the Young–Frobenius formula. Sagan describes the discovery as follows.

Despite the simplicity of the hook length formula, the Frame–Robinson–Thrall proof is not very insightful and does not provide any intuition for the role of the hooks. The search for a short, intuitive explanation befitting such a simple result gave rise to many alternate proofs.
Hillman and Grassl gave the first proof that illuminates the role of hooks in 1976 by proving a special case of the Stanley hook-content formula, which is known to imply the hook length formula.
Greene, Nijenhuis, and Wilf found a probabilistic proof using the hook walk in which the hook lengths appear naturally in 1979.
Remmel adapted the original Frame–Robinson–Thrall proof into the first bijective proof for the hook length formula in 1982.
A direct bijective proof was first discovered by Franzblau and Zeilberger in 1982.
Zeilberger also converted the Greene–Nijenhuis–Wilf hook walk proof into a bijective proof in 1984. A simpler direct bijection was announced by Pak and Stoyanovskii in 1992, and its complete proof was presented by the pair and Novelli in 1997.

Meanwhile, the hook length formula has been generalized in several ways.
R. M. Thrall found the analogue to the hook length formula for shifted Young Tableaux in 1952. Sagan gave a shifted hook walk proof for the hook length formula for shifted Young tableaux in 1980. 
Sagan and Yeh proved the hook length formula for binary trees using the hook walk in 1989. Proctor gave a poset generalization (see below).

Probabilistic proof

Knuth's heuristic argument 

The hook length formula can be understood intuitively using the following heuristic, but incorrect, argument suggested by D. E. Knuth.
Given that each element of a tableau is the smallest in its hook and filling the tableau shape at random, the probability that cell  will contain the minimum element of the corresponding hook is the reciprocal of the hook length.  Multiplying these probabilities over all  and  gives the formula. This argument is fallacious since the events are not independent.

Knuth's argument is however correct for the enumeration of labellings on trees satisfying monotonicity properties analogous to those of a Young tableau. In this case, the 'hook' events in question are in fact independent events.

Probabilistic proof using the hook walk 

This is a probabilistic proof found by  C. Greene, A. Nijenhuis, and H. S. Wilf in 1979. Define

 

We wish to show that . First,

(The maximal entry of the Young tableau of shape  occurs at one of its corner cells, so deleting it gives a Young tableaux of shape .)

 

which would imply  by induction. The above sum can be viewed as a sum of probabilities by writing it as

 

The hook walk is defined by the following rules.

 Pick a cell uniformly at random from  cells. Start the random walk from there.
 Successor of current cell  is chosen uniformly at random from the hook .
 Continue until you reach a corner cell .

 

where .

Given this, summing over all corner cells  gives  as claimed.

Connection to representations of the symmetric group 

Detailed discussion 
Their characters are related to the theory of symmetric functions via the Hall inner product:

For example, if  then .

Since the identity permutation  has the form  in cycle notation, the formula says

The expansion of Schur functions in terms of monomial symmetric functions uses the Kostka numbers:

The computation also shows that:

 

See Schur–Weyl duality.

Proof of hook formula using Frobenius formula

By the above considerations

so that 

where  is the Vandermonde determinant.

For the following we need at least as many variables as rows in the partition, so from now on we work with  variables .

Each term  is equal to

(See Schur function.) This is known as the Frobenius Character Formula, which gives one of the earliest proofs.

It remains only to simplify this coefficient. Multiplying

and

we conclude that our coefficient as

which can be written as

The latter sum is equal to the following determinant

which column-reduces to a Vandermonde determinant, and we obtain the formula

Note that  is the hook length of the first box in each row of the Young diagram, and this expression is easily transformed into the desired form : one shows , where the latter product runs over the th row of the Young diagram.

Connection to longest increasing subsequences 

The hook length formula also has important applications to the analysis of longest increasing subsequences in random permutations. This answers a question originally posed by Stanislaw Ulam. The proof is based on translating the question via the Robinson–Schensted correspondence to a problem about the limiting shape of a random Young tableau chosen according to Plancherel measure. Since the definition of Plancherel measure involves the quantity , the hook length formula can then be used to perform an asymptotic analysis of the limit shape and thereby also answer the original question.

The ideas of Vershik–Kerov and Logan–Shepp were later refined by Jinho Baik, Percy Deift and Kurt Johansson, who were able to achieve a much more precise analysis of the limiting behavior of the maximal increasing subsequence length, proving an important result now known as the Baik–Deift–Johansson theorem. Their analysis again makes crucial use of the fact that  has a number of good formulas, although instead of the hook length formula it made use of one of the determinantal expressions.

Related formulas 
The formula for the number of Young tableaux of shape  was originally derived from the Frobenius determinant formula in connection to representation theory:

Hook lengths can also be used to give a product representation to the generating function for the number of reverse plane partitions of a given shape. The hook lengths  can be defined as with Young tableaux.

Stanley discovered another formula for the same generating function. In general, if  is any poset with  elements, the generating function for reverse -partitions is 

In the case of a partition , we are considering the poset in its cells given by the relation 
.

So a linear extension is simply a standard Young tableau, i.e.

Proof of hook formula using Stanley's formula

Combining the two formulas for the generating functions we have

Both sides converge inside the disk of radius one and the following expression makes sense for 

It would be violent to plug in 1, but the right hand side is a continuous function inside the unit disk and a polynomial is continuous everywhere so at least we can say

Applying L'Hôpital's rule  times yields the hook length formula

Semi-standard tableaux hook length formula

Specializing this to  gives the number of semi-standard tableaux, which can be written in terms of hook lengths:The Young diagram  corresponds to an irreducible representation of the special linear group , and the Schur polynomial is also the character of the diagonal matrix  acting on this representation. The above specialization is thus the dimension of the irreducible representation, and the formula is an alternative to the more general Weyl dimension formula.

We may refine this by taking the principal specialization of the Schur function in the variables  :

where  for the conjugate partition .

Skew shape formula

There is a generalization of this formula for skew shapes,

Generalization to d-complete posets 
Young diagrams can be considered as finite order ideals in the poset , and standard Young tableaux are their linear extensions. Robert Proctor has given a generalization of the hook length formula to count linear extensions of a larger class of posets generalizing both trees and skew diagrams.

References

External links 

 The Surprising Mathematics of Longest Increasing Subsequences by Dan Romik. Contains discussions of the hook length formula and several of its variants, with applications to the mathematics of longest increasing subsequences.

Combinatorics